Procapperia pelecyntes is a moth of the family Pterophoridae. It is known from Japan (Kyushu), China, India and Sri Lanka.

The length of the forewings is 7–8 mm. Adults emerge from May to November in Japan.

The larvae feed on Scutellaria indica. They usually eat on the under surface of a leaf, and pupate on the stem very near the soil level or rarely on the under surface of a leaf. The pupa directs downwards.

External links
Taxonomic and Biological Studies of Pterophoridae of Japan (Lepidoptera)
Japanese Moths

Oxyptilini
Moths of Asia
Moths of Japan
Moths described in 1908
Taxa named by Edward Meyrick